María Belén Simari Birkner (born 18 August 1982) is a female skier from Argentina. She has represented Argentina in both the 2006 and the 2010 Winter Olympics, in the Alpine skiing events. She also took part in the 2005 Alpine Skiing World Cup, where she came 28th in the Women's Combined, and in the FIS Alpine World Ski Championships 2009. She is the sister of fellow alpine skiers Cristian Simari Birkner and Macarena Simari Birkner.

Results
2005 Alpine Skiing World Cup:Combined– 282006 Winter Olympics:Giant Slalom–DNF Slalom–37Super-G–47Combined–29FIS Alpine World Ski Championships 2007:Super Combined–27Giant Slalom–46Slalom–DNF2010 Winter Olympics:Downhill– 29Slalom– DNFGiant Slalom– 46Super-G– 31Combined– DNF

References

External links
 
 María Belén Simari Birkner at www.vancouver2010.com

1982 births
Living people
Argentine people of German descent
Alpine skiers at the 2002 Winter Olympics
Alpine skiers at the 2006 Winter Olympics
Alpine skiers at the 2010 Winter Olympics
Argentine female alpine skiers
Olympic alpine skiers of Argentina
Sportspeople from Bariloche